Sheikh Anwarul Haq (Punjabi and ‎; 11 May 1917– 3 March 1995), was a Pakistani jurist and an academic who served as the 9th Chief Justice of Pakistan from 23 September 1977 until resigning on 25 March 1981. He hanged Z.A Bhutto in a controversial murder case on April 4, 1977.

Educated as an economist at the DAV College and the Punjab University in Lahore, he served as a civil servant of the Indian Civil Service as an appointee to lead the municipal governance in the British India in 1944. He continued serving in the civil service after the independence of Pakistan as a result of partition of British India in 1947 and subsequently elevated as a judge in the Sindh High Court in 1957.

In 1962, he was nominated to be served in the Supreme Court and later appointed as Chief Justice of Lahore High Court in 1970 before his reappointment as a Senior Justice of the Supreme Court of Pakistan in 1971. He 1972, he earned public and international notability when he co-chaired the War Enquiry Commission with Chief Justice Hamoodur Rahman to investigate the economic and military collapse of Pakistan in a war against India in 1971 that led to the separation of East Pakistan as Bangladesh.

He was known for his judicial conservative philosophical leanings and is noted in country's political history for providing legality for the martial law upheld by chief of army staff General Zia-ul-Haq to restore law and order, in light of doctrine of necessity, as part of his conservative leanings. He also heard the case of Zulfikar Ali Bhutto as Chief Justice of the Supreme Court of Pakistan and constituted a 7 member (7 supreme court judges) bench to decide on the appeal of the capital sentence by the Lahore High Court for authorizing the death sentence of the ex-Prime Minister of Pakistan. After the death sentence of Zulfiqar Ali Bhutto, who was convicted of murdering through proxy the father of one of his political opponents, Haq took up the case against General Zia-ul-Haq's breaking his promise of holding elections. General Zia-ul-Haq introduced the PCO to legitimise his rule to by-pass the issues presented with this case and asked all the judges to sign an agreement accepting the PCO. Haq notably refused to take an oath under the imposed PCO, resigning on conscientious grounds. He also mobilised other like minded judges in the Supreme Court and High Courts to reject the proposed PCO by not signing the PCO. He was removed as Chief Justice of the Supreme Court of Pakistan due to his refusal to sign the PCO.

Biography

Early life and public service
Sheikh Anwarul Haq was born in Jullunder, Punjab, British India on 11 May 1917, to a Punjabi family. S. Anwarul Haq earned early education from Jullunder and Wazirabad, passing his matriculation from Jullunder in 1932. He stood first in matriculation that earned him a scholarship to attend the DAV College in 1932. In 1936, he earned BA in Economics and Political science and went on to attend the D.A.V. College, Lahore of Punjab University, where he earned an MA in Economics in 1938. He ranked first in MA in Economics examination at the Punjab University, setting a new record in that subject.

During his time at the Punjab University, Haq participated in a large number of declamation contests and prize debates and was often judged as the best speaker. From 1936–38, he was an activist of All-India Muslim League and was a student advocate of the assertion of the separate identity of Indian Muslims. He attended the All-India Muslim League meeting in Calcutta in December 1937 as a student delegate.

In 1939, he was selected and joined the Indian Civil Service and went to United Kingdom to be educated in Oxford. Upon returning in 1940, he was appointed Assistant Commissioner at Ferozepur and later appointed as Undersecretary of Punjab and the North-West Frontier from 1942 until 1944. In 1944, he was appointed as Sub Divisional Magistrate at the Dalhousie, India and heard various cases involving the civil lawsuits. During the same time, he was sent to Gurdaspur and was appointed as Deputy Commissioner and later elevated as Session Judge as well as Assistant Commissioner in 1946. For a short brief of time, he served as the deputy commissioner of Hissar (in East Punjab) in 1946, before joining the Cabinet Mission to be served as its Secretary to the Partition Steering Committee for the Punjab in 1947.

After the establishment of Pakistan as a result of partition of British India by the British Empire, he opted for Pakistan and appointed as deputy commissioner of Rawalpindi, Punjab, Pakistan. During this time, he worked towards managing the Indian emigrants settling in Pakistan. From 1948 to 1952, he served in the bureaucracy as deputy commissioner of Montgomery and Sialkot.

In 1952, he joined the Ministry of Defence (MoD) as its deputy secretary until 1954 when he left for the United Kingdom to attend the Imperial Defence College in London. In 1956, he earned the degree and secured his graduation from the Imperial Defence College and subsequently returned to Pakistan. He was appointed as joint secretary in MoD but later moved to Ministry of Law and Justice (MoLJ) to pursue career as federal judge.

Supreme court and chief justice
In 1957, he was elevated as district-session judge in Sindh High Court but later moved to Lahore High Court in Punjab in 1958.

In 1959, he was appointed as a judge in the West Pakistan High Court and moved on to the Supreme Court as a senior justice in 1962. In 1965, he was appointed as the deputy leader of the Pakistan Delegation to the Third Commonwealth and Empire Law Conference held at Sydney, Australia in 1965. In 1967, he was appointed as a member of the Law Reform Commission led by Chief Justice Alvin Robert Cornelius that conducted the various case studies on land reforms in Pakistan.

In 1969, he was selected to lead a Legal Expert Delegation to Somalia to provide expertise in overviewing the constitutional crises in Somalia. In 1970, he was elevated as Chief Justice of the Lahore High Court by President Yahya Khan who issued the decree, the LFO No. 1970 that dissolved the status of West Pakistan.

He witnessed the war between India and Pakistan that resulted in the separation of East Pakistan as Bangladesh.

On 26 December 1971, he was named as a member of the War Enquiry Commission (WEC) along with Chief Justice Hamoodur Rahman, and the chief justices of the Sindh, Balochistan, and Punjab High Court, formed by the Chief Justice Rahman on the request of then-President Zulfikar Ali Bhutto. On 1 January 1972, he was re-elevated as the senior justice at the Supreme Court.

Haq attended the Third Commonwealth and Empire Law Conference in Sydney, Australia in August–September 1965 as leader of the Pakistan delegation. He was interested in academic and educational activities and had been a member of the Syndicates of:
 Punjab University
 University of Engineering and Technology, Lahore
 University of Agriculture, Faisalabad in Lyallpur (now called Faisalabad)
 Allama Iqbal Open University, Islamabad

Haq was President of the Himayat-i-Islam Law College, Lahore for several years. He was acting Vice-Chancellor of Punjab University on multiple occasions. He was appointed as a member of the 1971 War Inquiry Commission from January 1972 to November 1974 along with CJ Hamoodur Rahman. He was also appointed as Chairman of the National Pay Commission and Armed Forces Pay Commission in January 1976. He represented the Pakistan Supreme Court at the centenary celebrations of the Supreme Court of Ghana at Accra in October 1976. He was appointed Chairman of the Commission on the Indus River System in September 1977. He was appointed Chairman of the Civil Services Commission in February 1978. He had been President of the British Universities Alumni Association, Lahore since 1962. He was a guest speaker at a large number of social, intellectual, and cultural functions in Lahore, Rawalpindi, and Karachi.

See also
Chief Justice of Pakistan
Supreme Court of Pakistan
List of Pakistanis

References

1917 births
1995 deaths
People from Jalandhar
Punjabi people
People from Lahore
University of the Punjab alumni
Chhatrapati Shahu Ji Maharaj University alumni
Indian Civil Service (British India) officers
Pakistani civil servants
Pakistan Army civilians
Pakistan Navy civilians
Pakistan Air Force civilians
H
Graduates of the Royal College of Defence Studies
Justices of the Supreme Court of Pakistan
Chief justices of Pakistan
Pakistani ethicists
Philosophers of law
Controversies in Pakistan
Academic staff of the University of Engineering and Technology, Lahore
Academic staff of the University of the Punjab
Acting presidents of Pakistan
1977 controversies
List